Anya-Josephine Marie Taylor-Joy (born 16 April 1996) is an actress. She has won several accolades, including a Golden Globe Award and a Screen Actors Guild Award, in addition to nominations for a BAFTA Film Award and a Primetime Emmy Award.

Born in Miami and raised in Buenos Aires and London, Taylor-Joy left school at the age of 16 to pursue an acting career. After portraying small television roles, she found success through a role in the horror film The Witch (2015). Taylor-Joy later starred in the horror film Split (2016), its sequel Glass (2019), and the black comedy Thoroughbreds (2017). She won the Trophée Chopard at the 2017 Cannes Film Festival.

Taylor-Joy appeared in the fifth and sixth seasons of the television crime drama Peaky Blinders (2019–2022), and played Emma Woodhouse in the period drama Emma (2020), which gained her a Golden Globe Award nomination. Also in 2020, she received acclaim for her performance as chess prodigy Beth Harmon in the Netflix miniseries The Queen's Gambit, winning a Golden Globe Award and a Screen Actors Guild Award and receiving a nomination for an Emmy Award. Taylor-Joy has since starred in the films Last Night in Soho (2021), The Northman, and The Menu (both 2022), earning another Golden Globe Award nomination for the last of these.

Early life
Taylor-Joy was born on 16 April 1996 in Miami, Florida, to Dennis Alan Taylor, a former banker, and Jennifer Marina Joy, a psychologist. She has stated that her birth in Miami was a "fluke", since her parents had been holidaying in the city at the time; because of her birthplace, she holds American citizenship due to the country's jus soli nationality law. Her father is an Argentine of English and Scottish descent, the son of a British father and an Anglo-Argentine mother. Her mother was born in Zambia to an English diplomat father, David Joy, and a Spanish mother from Barcelona. She is the youngest of six siblings, four of whom are from her father's previous marriage.

Taylor-Joy lived with her family in Buenos Aires and attended Northlands School until the age of six, when the family relocated to the Victoria area of London. She is fluent in both Spanish and English. Taylor-Joy experienced the move as "traumatic" and initially refused to learn English in hopes of moving back to Argentina. She attended Hill House International Junior School and Queen's Gate School, acting in school productions. She struggled at school, recalling:

Taylor-Joy initially trained in dance, studying ballet until the age of 15. Aged 17, she was scouted as a model by Storm Management founder Sarah Doukas, while walking her dog outside Harrods department store in Knightsbridge, London. She signed with the agency on the condition that acting was her passion and pursuit. During a modelling shoot promoting the television series Downton Abbey which she had almost rejected because she was studying for her GCSE examinations, Taylor-Joy was noticed by the Downton Abbey actor Allen Leech running errands for the crew and reciting the Séamus Heaney poem "Digging" for a forthcoming screentest. He later introduced her to his agent, with whom she signed as an actress.

Career

Early work and breakthrough (2013–2019)
Taylor-Joy was removed from the final cut of her first acting role as a background 'Feeder Girl' in the 2014 fantasy comedy-horror Vampire Academy, with her role left uncredited. She made her television debut as Philippa Collins-Davidson in an episode of the detective drama series Endeavour, followed by a multi-episode arc in the 2015 fantasy-adventure drama series Atlantis. That same year, she starred in The Witch, a period horror film directed by Robert Eggers, which tells the story of a Puritan family that encounters forces of evil in the woods beyond their New England farm. It premiered at the 2015 Sundance Film Festival to critical acclaim. The role was her breakthrough. Anthony Lane of The New Yorker called Taylor-Joy "remarkable in the role, her wide-eyed innocence entwined with a thread of cunning—proof either of her quick wits, scarcely unusual in a clever and curious girl, or of some fell purpose." She won the Gotham Independent Film Award for Breakthrough Actor and the Empire Award for Best Female Newcomer.

The following year, Taylor-Joy starred in Luke Scott's science fiction horror film Morgan, playing the title character. It received negative reviews and was a commercial failure, but Booth Michigan'''s John Serba wrote that "Taylor-Joy disarms us with a performance that keenly teeter-totters between little-girl innocent and dead-eyed viciousness." She next starred in the drama film Barry, which focused on a young Barack Obama during his first year at Columbia University in 1981; it premiered at the 2016 Toronto International Film Festival. The same year, Taylor-Joy's likeness was licensed from Storm Management to represent the character of Valkyrie Cain on the tenth anniversary book cover of Skulduggery Pleasant, and subsequently the covers of the seventh, eighth, ninth, and fourteenth books in the series, before she appeared in the music video for Skrillex's remix of GTA's song "Red Lips".

In 2016, she was cast opposite James McAvoy in M. Night Shyamalan's Split, where she played Casey Cooke, a teenage girl abducted by a man with multiple personalities (McAvoy). It was a commercial success, grossing $278.5 million on a budget of $9 million. Her next film that year was Cory Finley's directorial debut Thoroughbreds. It co-starred Olivia Cooke and Anton Yelchin in his final film role. Taylor-Joy played Lily, a high-school student who schemes to kill her stepfather via a contract with a drug dealer. It premiered at the 2017 Sundance Film Festival; David Ehrlich of IndieWire called her performance "captivating". Her third release in 2017 was Sergio G. Sánchez's horror mystery Marrowbone; Tasha Robinson of The Verge wrote that Taylor-Joy brought "a shy, appealing warmth" to an inconsistent character. Taylor-Joy was nominated for the BAFTA Rising Star Award, and was awarded the Trophée Chopard at the Cannes Film Festival that year. In December 2017, she portrayed Petronella Oortman in the BBC One period drama miniseries The Miniaturist, based on Jessie Burton's novel of the same name.

Taylor-Joy reprised her role as Casey Cooke in the 2019 psychological superhero film Glass, the final film in the Unbreakable film trilogy, appearing with McAvoy, Samuel L. Jackson and Sarah Paulson. It was a commercial success, grossing $247 million worldwide, Later that year, she appeared in the documentary film Love, Antosha, on the life and career of her late co-star Anton Yelchin; and in Hozier's music video for his song "Dinner & Diatribes". Her next two 2019 films, the animated musical adventure film Playmobil: The Movie and biographical drama film Radioactive, were commercial failures. She also voiced the character of Brea in the Netflix animated fantasy series The Dark Crystal: Age of Resistance. In her final role of 2019, she played the starring role of Gina Gray in the BBC One period crime drama series Peaky Blinders.

Rise to prominence (2020–present)
In 2020, Taylor-Joy starred as Emma Woodhouse in Autumn de Wilde's directorial debut Emma, an adaptation of Jane Austen's 1815 novel of the same name. Reviewing the film, Peter Travers of Rolling Stone deemed Taylor-Joy "incandescent". The Guardian critic Mark Kermode described Taylor-Joy as having created an "admirably spiky character who is less likable than some of her screen predecessors, and all the better for it". She received a Golden Globe Award nomination for her performance. Taylor-Joy also portrayed Illyana Rasputin/Magik, a Russian mutant and sorceress, in the superhero horror film The New Mutants. It was originally intended for release in April 2018 but experienced several delays; it was released in 2020.

Taylor-Joy starred in the Netflix miniseries The Queen's Gambit as Beth Harmon, an orphaned chess prodigy on her rise to the top of the chess world while struggling with drug and alcohol dependency. The series and her performance received widespread critical acclaim. Netflix announced that it had been seen by 62 million households in its first 28 days of release, becoming its "biggest scripted limited series to date." Darren Franich of Entertainment Weekly called Taylor-Joy's performance "darkly fascinating" and noted how she "excels in the quiet moments, [with] her eyelids narrowing as she decimates an opponent, [and] her whole body physicalizing angry desperation when the game turns against her." Similarly, Caroline Framke of Variety found her "so magnetic that when she stares down the camera lens, her flinty glare threatens to cut right through it." Taylor-Joy's portrayal won her the Golden Globe Award for Best Actress – Miniseries or Television Film and the Screen Actors Guild Award for Outstanding Performance by a Female Actor in a Miniseries or Television Movie and garnered her a nomination for the Primetime Emmy Award for Outstanding Lead Actress in a Limited or Anthology Series or Movie.

In 2020, she next appeared in the drama film Here Are the Young Men, directed by Eoin Macken and based on the novel of the same name by Rob Doyle. In 2021, she starred in Edgar Wright's psychological horror film Last Night in Soho. In the film, she performs the song "Downtown" by Petula Clark; a music video of Taylor-Joy's rendition was also released. Joe Morgenstern of The Wall Street Journal highlighted the "dazzling sense of purpose" in her portrayal. She was included on Time magazine's 100 Next list that same year.

In 2022, Taylor-Joy reunited with The Witch director Robert Eggers for a starring role opposite Alexander Skarsgård in the historical epic The Northman. Based on the old Scandinavian legend of Amleth, the film was described as "a Viking revenge saga set in Iceland at the turn of century". It was released on April 22, 2022 to a positive critical reception. Taylor-Joy then appeared in David O. Russell's period comedy Amsterdam, which emerged as a critical and commercial failure. Released the following month was Mark Mylod's black comedy thriller The Menu, in which Taylor-Joy starred opposite Nicholas Hoult and Ralph Fiennes. The film garnered largely positive reviews, and her performance gained her a Golden Globe Award nomination.

Taylor-Joy will next star as the titular character in George Miller's action film Furiosa, which will serve as a prequel to the 2015 film Mad Max: Fury Road. She will also have a voice role as Princess Peach in the animated film The Super Mario Bros. Movie.

Public imageThe Hollywood Reporter named Taylor-Joy on their list of 2016 Hollywood's Rising Stars 35 and Under, and she was included in a similar list compiled by W magazine in 2017. In 2019, she appeared on the annual Forbes 30 Under 30 list, a compilation of "the brightest young entrepreneurs, innovators and game changers in the world". In 2020, she was named "Breakthrough Entertainer" of the Year by the Associated Press and "Breakout Star of 2020" by the New York Post. In 2021, Time'' magazine included Taylor-Joy on its 100 Next list of "emerging leaders who are shaping the future", with a tribute written by former World Chess Champion Garry Kasparov.

She has been an ambassador for brands including Viktor & Rolf, Tiffany & Co. Dior's fashion and makeup, and Jaeger-LeCoultre.

Filmography

Film

Television

Music videos

Awards and nominations

Taylor-Joy has received several accolades. She won the Empire Award for Best Newcomer and being nominated for the Saturn Award for Best Performance by a Younger Actor in 2016. The following year, she was a nominee for the BAFTA Rising Star Award and the recipient of the Trophée Chopard. Taylor-Joy won the Golden Globe Award for Best Actress – Miniseries or Television Film, and the Screen Actors Guild Award for Outstanding Performance by a Female Actor in a Miniseries or Television Movie in 2021.

Explanatory notes

References

External links

 

1996 births
Living people
21st-century American actresses
21st-century Argentine actresses
21st-century English actresses
Actresses from Buenos Aires
Actresses from London
Actresses from Miami
American film actresses
American people of Argentine descent
American people of English descent
American people of Scottish descent
American people of Spanish descent
American television actresses
American voice actresses
Argentine female models
Argentine film actresses
Argentine people of English descent
Argentine people of Scottish descent
Argentine people of Spanish descent
Argentine television actresses
Argentine voice actresses
Best Miniseries or Television Movie Actress Golden Globe winners
British actors of Latin American descent
English female models
English film actresses
English people of Argentine descent
English people of Scottish descent
English people of Spanish descent
English television actresses
English voice actresses
Female models from Florida
Hispanic and Latino American actresses
Models from London
Outstanding Performance by a Female Actor in a Miniseries or Television Movie Screen Actors Guild Award winners
People educated at Queen's Gate School
People from Victoria, London
Chopard Trophy for Female Revelation winners